The Fourth Alarm is a 1926 short silent comedy film directed by Robert F. McGowan. It was the 53rd Our Gang short subject released. It was later reworked in Hook and Ladder in 1932.

Notes
This is Mary Kornman's final Our Gang appearance as a child.  She would appear again later in several episodes as an adult.

Cast

The Gang
 Joe Cobb as Joe
 Jackie Condon as Jackie
 Johnny Downs as Johnny
 Allen Hoskins as Farina
 Jannie Hoskins as Mango
 Mary Kornman as Mary
 Mildred Kornman as Mildred
 Scooter Lowry as Skooter
 Jay R. Smith as Turkie-egg
 Bobby Young as Bonedust
 Billy Naylor - Our Gang member
 Pal the Dog as himself
 Buster the Dog as himself
 Dinah the Mule as Humidor

Additional cast
 Charles A. Bachman - Officer
 Ed Brandenburg - Fireman
 George B. French - Chemis
 Ham Kinsey - Fireman
 Sam Lufkin - Crowd extra
 Gene Morgan - Fireman

See also
 Our Gang filmography

References

External links

1926 films
1926 comedy films
American black-and-white films
Films directed by Robert F. McGowan
Hal Roach Studios short films
American silent short films
Our Gang films
1926 short films
1920s American films
Silent American comedy films